Abdelhafid "Abdel" Al Badaoui Sabri (born 25 May 1996) is a Moroccan professional footballer who plays as an attacking midfielder for Qatari club Al Kharaitiyat.

Club career
Al Badaoui made his senior debut for Visé on 30 March 2014, coming on as a late substitute for Idrissa Camará in a 0–0 Belgian First Division B home draw against Eupen. In July of that year, he moved to Sint-Truiden and was initially assigned to the under-19 squad.

In 2016, after playing for STVVs under-21 squad, Al Badaoui signed for Standard Liège, but only played for their under-21 side. In the following year, he signed for RFC Seraing in the Belgian First Amateur Division.

Al Badaoui subsequently established himself as a starter for Seraing, and renewed his contract with the club in May 2019. He helped in their promotion to the second division in 2020 and to the Belgian First Division A in 2021, but terminated his contract with the club on 23 July 2021.

On 31 July 2021, Al Badaoui signed a two-year contract with Spanish Segunda División side AD Alcorcón. The following 15 January, he returned to Belgium after agreeing to a loan deal with Waasland-Beveren until June.

References

External links
 
 

1997 births
Living people
Moroccan footballers
Association football midfielders
C.S. Visé players
R.F.C. Seraing (1922) players
AD Alcorcón footballers
S.K. Beveren players
Al Kharaitiyat SC players
Challenger Pro League players
Belgian National Division 1 players
Segunda División players
Moroccan expatriate footballers
Expatriate footballers in Belgium
Moroccan expatriate sportspeople in Belgium
Expatriate footballers in Spain
Moroccan expatriate sportspeople in Spain
Expatriate footballers in Qatar
Moroccan expatriate sportspeople in Qatar